Bill Haas (born June 25, 1949) is an American politician in the state of Minnesota. He served in the Minnesota House of Representatives.

References

Republican Party members of the Minnesota House of Representatives
1949 births
Living people
People from Burbank, California
People from Champlin, Minnesota
Businesspeople from Minnesota
University of Minnesota alumni